Ivachevo is a rural locality (a selo) in Kukkuyanovsky Selsoviet, Dyurtyulinsky District, Bashkortostan, Russia. The population was 541 as of 2010. There are 4 streets.

Geography 
Ivachevo is located 30 km south of Dyurtyuli (the district's administrative centre) by road. Saitovo is the nearest rural locality.

References 

Rural localities in Dyurtyulinsky District